Mesodontrachia is a genus of air-breathing land snail, a terrestrial pulmonate gastropod mollusk in the family Camaenidae.

Species 
Species within the genus Mesodontrachia include:
 Mesodontrachia desmonda
 Mesodontrachia fitzroyana

References 

 Nomenclator Zoologicus info

 
Camaenidae
Taxonomy articles created by Polbot